Mark Jan Hendrik Tuitert (born 4 April 1980) is a retired Dutch speed skater. He won gold at the 1500 m at the 2010 Winter Olympics.

Personal life
Tuitert married fellow Dutch speed skater Helen van Goozen in 2009. Ten years before, they both won gold medals at the World Junior Speed Skating Championships.

Speed skating career

2006 Olympic Games in Turin

Tuitert participated in the team pursuit event at the 2006 Winter Olympics, with teammates Sven Kramer, Carl Verheijen, Erben Wennemars and Rintje Ritsma. The Dutch team was a favourite and was leading Italy by nearly a full second in their semifinal matchup, but Sven Kramer stepped on a block and fell, taking Carl Verheijen with him. In the race for bronze they defeated Norway, giving Tuitert his first Olympic medal.

2010 Olympic Games in Vancouver

At the 2010 Winter Olympics in Vancouver, British Columbia he won the gold medal in the 1500 m. In the 17th pair against Håvard Bøkko he set a new track record time (1:45.57), which had been in the hands of Shani Davis (1:46.19). In the last heat, Davis failed by 0.13 seconds to improve on Tuitert's time and finished second.

Until then, the only other Dutch Olympic gold medal winners in the 1500 meters speed skating were Kees Verkerk at the 1968 Winter Olympics and Ard Schenk at the 1972 Winter Olympics.

2014 Olympic Games in Sochi

At the 2014 Winter Olympics in Sochi Tuitert finished 10th in the 1000 m and 5th in the 1500 m.

Other

Tuitert highest ranking on the adelskalender. was the 6th position between 30 December 2000 and 2 March 2001.

Life after skating 
After his speed skating career Tuitert co-founded First Energy Gum, a company which produces caffeinated Energy Gum for athletes. Tuitert is also a pundit in speed skating for Dutch broadcaster NOS and an online fitness coach for FitChannel.com. Further, he has a podcast called "Drive", in which he interviews a large variety of professionals (i.e. athletes, scientists, entrepreneurs) with a drive. In 2021 his book " Drive: train your stoic mindset" was published in the Netherlands (Drive: train je stoicijnse mindset).

Records

World records

 ** Together with Carl Verheijen and Erben Wennemars

Personal records
To put his personal records in perspective, the column Notes lists the official world records on the dates that Tuitert skated his personal records.

Source: marktuitert.nl

Tuitert has a score of 149.198 points on the Adelskalender

Tournament overview

Source:

World Cup overview 

Source:
 NC = No classification
 DSQ = Disqualified
 DNF = Did not finish
 DNQ = Did not qualify
 * = 10000 meter

Medals won

References

External links

Official website Mark Tuitert

1980 births
Dutch male speed skaters
Speed skaters at the 2006 Winter Olympics
Speed skaters at the 2010 Winter Olympics
Speed skaters at the 2014 Winter Olympics
Olympic speed skaters of the Netherlands
Olympic medalists in speed skating
Medalists at the 2006 Winter Olympics
Medalists at the 2010 Winter Olympics
Olympic gold medalists for the Netherlands
Olympic bronze medalists for the Netherlands
People from Holten
Living people
World Single Distances Speed Skating Championships medalists
Sportspeople from Overijssel